Boston Legal is an American legal dramedy that ran on ABC from October 3, 2004, to December 8, 2008. The show follows the cases and personal lives of the lawyers of law firm Crane, Pool and Schmidt. The show has been nominated for a variety of awards, including 26 Primetime Emmy Awards, eleven Screen Actors Guild Awards, six Satellite Awards, four Golden Globe Awards, two Producers Guild of America Awards and a Peabody Award.

Most of these nominations are for acting, of the show's ensemble cast numerous actors have received nominations. James Spader has received the most award nominations, 15 in total, while winning 3. Spader is closely followed by William Shatner, who received a total of 14 nominations, winning 3 awards as well. The crew members with most award nominations are producer and director Bill D'Elia, with six nominations and zero wins, and show creator David E. Kelley, with five nominations and one win. In total Boston Legal has been nominated for 62 awards, and won 14.

Emmy Awards
The Primetime Emmy Awards are presented yearly by the Academy of Television Arts & Sciences, they are considered to be the television equivalent to the Academy Awards, and thus one of the highest honours for television shows. The awards are divided into regular Primetime Emmy Awards, which honour acting, directing and writing in television, and Creative Arts Primetime Emmy Awards, which honour behind-the-scenes technical work such as editing and sound mixing. Boston Legal has been nominated for a total of 26 Primetime Emmy Awards, winning five in total, four of which were for acting. The show was nominated for "Outstanding Drama Series" in 2007 and 2008 yet never won in that category.

Primetime Emmy Awards

Creative Arts Primetime Emmy Awards

Golden Globe Awards

Boston Legal has been nominated for four Hollywood Foreign Press Association's Golden Globe awards during its run, it has received one in 2005.

Satellite Awards
The Satellite awards, presented annually by the International Press Academy, honour excellence in film and television. Of its total of six nominations, Boston Legal has won one, which went to James Spader in 2006.

Screen Actors Guild Awards

The Screen Actors Guild Awards are presented annually by SAG-AFTRA. Boston Legal has received eleven nominations during its run, including three for Outstanding Performance by an Ensemble in a Drama Series, but has never won any. James Spader has received most Screen Actors Guild Award nominations, four individual and three along with the rest of the cast.

Other Awards
Boston Legal has been nominated for various guild and society awards, including Producers Guild of America Awards, a Directors Guild of America Award, American Cinema Editors Eddie Awards and a People's Choice Award. Amongst the wins for the series are four Prism Awards and a GLAAD Media Award. In 2005, Boston Legal was awarded a Peabody Award "for fearing neither silliness nor social commentary and for adroitly combining the two".

References

External links
Awards and Nominations for Boston Legal at the Internet Movie Database

Boston Legal
Awards and nominations